Dioryctria majorella is a species of snout moth in the genus Dioryctria. It was described by Harrison Gray Dyar Jr. in 1919 and is known from Mexico.

The wingspan is 20–26 mm. The forewing ground colour is greyish brown with two pale grey transverse bands. The hindwings are grey, but darker along the margins.

The larvae feed on Pinus caribaea var. hondurensis, Pinus leiophylla, Pinus maximinoi and Pinus oocarpa. They feed in cones and branches infested by Cronartium conigenum.

References

Moths described in 1919
majorella